The Immediate Geographic Region of Iturama is one of the 4 immediate geographic regions in the Intermediate Geographic Region of Uberaba, one of the 70 immediate geographic regions in the Brazilian state of Minas Gerais and one of the 509 of Brazil, created by the National Institute of Geography and Statistics (IBGE) in 2017.

Municipalities 
It comprises 5 municipalities.

 Carneirinho    
 Iturama   
 Limeira do Oeste   
 São Francisco de Sales     
 União de Minas

See also 

 List of Intermediate and Immediate Geographic Regions of Minas Gerais

References 

Geography of Minas Gerais